The 2006 Winter Olympics, officially known as the XX Olympic Winter Games, was a winter multi-sport event held in Turin, Italy, from February 10 to February 26, 2006. A total of 2,508 athletes representing 80 National Olympic Committees (NOCs) (+3 from 2002 Olympics) participated in 84 events (+6 from 2002) from 15 different sports and disciplines (unchanged from 2002).

Athletes from 26 NOCs won at least one medal, and athletes from 18 of these NOCs secured at least one gold. Germany won the highest number of gold medals (11) and led in overall medals (29) for the third consecutive Games. Latvia and Slovakia won the first medals in their Winter Olympic history.

Speed skater Cindy Klassen of Canada won five medals (one gold, two silver and two bronze) and was the most medalled athlete at the Games. Biathlete Michael Greis of Germany and short track speed skaters Ahn Hyun Soo and Jin Sun-Yu, both of South Korea, tied for the most gold medals, with three each.

Changes in medal standings

One athlete was stripped of an Olympic medal during these Games. Russian biathlete Olga Pyleva won a silver medal in the 15 km race, but tested positive for carphedon and lost her medal. Germany's Martina Glagow was given the silver medal and fellow Russian Albina Akhatova (who was caught doping in 2009 and missed the 2010 Olympics) won the bronze.

IOC retesting
The IOC has retested nearly 500 doping samples that were collected at the 2006 Turin Games. In 2014, the Estonian Olympic Committee was notified by the IOC that a retested sample from cross-country skier Kristina Šmigun had tested positive. On 24 October 2016, the World Anti-Doping Agency Athletes' Commission stated that Šmigun, who won two gold medals at the Turin Games, would face a Court of Arbitration for Sport hearing before the end of October. In December 2017, IOC announced that re-analysis of samples resulted in no positive cases.

Medal table

The medal table is based on information provided by the International Olympic Committee (IOC) and is consistent with IOC convention in its published medal tables. By default, the table is ordered by the number of gold medals the athletes from a nation have won, where nation is an entity represented by a National Olympic Committee (NOC). The number of silver medals is taken into consideration next and then the number of bronze medals. If nations are still tied, equal ranking is given and they are listed alphabetically.

Change by doping

See also
 2006 Winter Paralympics medal table
 List of 2006 Winter Olympics medal winners

References

External links
 
 
 
 
 
 

Medal count
2006